Vladimir Sergeyevich Sviridov (born 10 May 1990) is a Russian para-athlete competing mainly in category F36 long jump and shot put. In 2013 he took the gold in the shot put at the IPC Athletics World Championships equaling his own world record which he set two months earlier in Emmeloord.

Personal history
Sviridov was born in Novocherkassk, Soviet Union in 1990. He was born with cerebral palsy. He is married to fellow Russian para-athlete Elena Ivanova.

Career history
Sviridov's first major international competition was the 2011 IPC Athletics World Championships held in Christchurch, New Zealand. There he took two medals, gold in the F36 long jump with a distance of 5.29m, and silver in the F35-36 shot put. His gold winning performance in the long jump set a new Championship record in the F36 category, just 4 cm behind Roman Pavlyk's world record. Sviridov represented Russia at the 2012 Summer Paralympics in London where he competed in the F36 long jump, his favoured F36 shot put was not a featured event of the games. He posted a distance of 5.08m in the long jump taking the bronze medal.

The next year he again represented Russia at the IWAS Dutch Open in Emmeloord, setting a new world record in the shot put with a distance of 14.70m. Two months later he travelled to Lyon to take part in the 2013 IPC Athletics World Championships. At the games he won gold in the shot put, equaling his world record throw of 14.70m set at Emmeloord.

Notes

External links
 

Paralympic athletes of Russia
Athletes (track and field) at the 2012 Summer Paralympics
Paralympic bronze medalists for Russia
Living people
1990 births
World record holders in Paralympic athletics
People from Novocherkassk
Russian male long jumpers
Russian male shot putters
Track and field athletes with cerebral palsy
Cerebral Palsy category Paralympic competitors
Medalists at the 2012 Summer Paralympics
Medalists at the 2020 Summer Paralympics
Paralympic medalists in athletics (track and field)
Athletes (track and field) at the 2020 Summer Paralympics
Paralympic gold medalists for the Russian Paralympic Committee athletes
Sportspeople from Rostov Oblast